Steve Thompson (born February 12, 1945) is a former American football defensive tackle. He played high school football at Lake Stevens High School and college football at the University of Washington in Seattle under head coach Jim Owens.

Selected in the second round of the 1968 NFL/AFL Draft (44th overall), Thompson spent five seasons with the New York Jets in 1968–1970 and 1972–1973 before playing with the Portland Storm of the World Football League in 1974 and the B.C. Lions of the Canadian Football League in 1975. 

From 1991 to August 2015, he was the senior pastor at Victory Foursquare Church in Marysville, Washington. He received a doctoral degree in Transformational Leadership from Bakke Graduate University in 2020.

References
 Steve Thompson NFL.com
 "Where Are They Now: Steve Thompson" Seattle Post-Intelligencer October 21, 2003
 Pastor Stephen Victory Foursquare Church website

External links
 

1945 births
Living people
People from Marysville, Washington
Washington Huskies football players
New York Jets players
Portland Storm players
BC Lions players
American football defensive tackles
American Football League players